Lefcourt is a surname. Notable people with the surname include:

Abraham E. Lefcourt (1876–1932), American real estate developer
Gerald B. Lefcourt, American criminal defense lawyer 
Peter Lefcourt (born 1946), American television producer, film and television screenwriter, and novelist